Wanguo Quantu or the Complete Map of the Myriad Countries is a map developed in the 1620s by the Jesuit Giulio Aleni in Ming China following the earlier work of Matteo Ricci, who was the first Jesuit to speak Chinese and to publish maps of the world in Chinese from 1574 to 1603. Aleni modified Ricci's maps to accommodate Chinese demands for a Sinocentric projection, placing the "Middle Kingdom" at the center of the visual field. 



See also
 Kunyu Wanguo Quantu, Matteo Ricci's 1602 world map.
 Shanhai Yudi Quantu, a contemporary Chinese map inspired by Matteo Ricci's work.
 Cheonhado, a contemporary Korean circular world map.

References

Citations

Bibliography
 The Sino-European Map (“Shanhai yudi quantu”) in the Encyclopedia Sancai tuhui Roderich Ptak 
 Wigal, Donald (2000) Historic Maritime Maps, Parkstone Press, New York,

External links
Vatican exhibit

Historic maps of the world
1620s in China
17th-century maps and globes